Hot Head Burritos is a restaurant chain based in Dayton, Ohio. The restaurant specializes in Mexican-style burritos and other Mexican-style foods. Hot Head Burritos was ranked by AOL.com in 2009 as one of America's next big chains. In 2011, Hot Head Burritos was named 41st on FastCasual's list of 2011's Top 100 Movers and Shakers.

As of November 2022, 81 locations were in operation in the United States.

History 
The company plans to continue to add more restaurants in the Dayton region. They have also announced plans to expand into Kentucky and Cincinnati. In 2011, Hot Head announced plans to move into the Columbus, Ohio market. The company in planning for up to 50 restaurants in the Columbus area. On September 21, 2011, Hot Head Burritos opened their first store in the Columbus area located in the Columbus suburb of Hilliard. In November 2011, the restaurant signed a deal for more than 30 additional Ohio locations. As of September 2019, the restaurant had 78 locations: 1 in Alabama, 1 in Connecticut, 3 in Florida, 3 in Indiana, 4 in Kentucky, 1 in Massachusetts, 62 in Ohio, 2 in Pennsylvania, and 1 in Texas. Hot Head Burritos operates as a franchise with their headquarters located in Kettering, Ohio, a suburb of Dayton.

References

External links
 Official website

Companies based in Dayton, Ohio
Culture of Dayton, Ohio
Regional restaurant chains in the United States
Restaurants in Ohio
Restaurants established in 2007
American companies established in 2007
Mexican restaurants in the United States
2007 establishments in Ohio